Social IQ, formerly known as Soovox Inc. is an integrated influence platform that measures users' online influence and rewards people for driving Word Of Mouth.
The analysis is done through an algorithm that uses data drawing from key social networks such as Facebook, Twitter and LinkedIn to compute the social IQ score and then classifies the users accordingly.

History
Social IQ is a San Diego based company founded in the mid-2009 by Akram Benmbarek.

Similar metrics
Klout
PeerIndex

References 

Social media
Social media management platforms